Divine Madness is the 1992 greatest hits album from the British ska/pop band Madness.

Content
The album presents the group's UK single A-sides from 1979 through 1986 in chronological order, though their version of "The Sweetest Girl" is omitted.  ("The Sweetest Girl" was the only Madness single of this era to miss the top 30.)  Also, some tracks are presented in their LP rather than single versions. The 1992/1995 Japanese CD versions add "In The City", which was a single there.

Releases
The album peaked at number 1 in the UK charts, and it eventually led to a Madness reunion and their first concert in six years (which was recorded for their Madstock! album).

Divine Madness was also released as a video and eventually DVD with all Madness music videos, including the album track "Bed & Breakfast Man", the omitted single "Sweetest Girl", and the 1988 single "I Pronounce You" (issued as by The Madness). The group's Japanese TV adverts for Honda City cars were also included.

The album was re-packaged in 1998 as The Heavy Heavy Hits with the addition of the single version of "The Sweetest Girl" (placed in its correct chronological position after "Uncle Sam").

In 2000 it was re-issued, under its original title of Divine Madness, with the further 1999 singles "Lovestruck" and "Johnny the Horse" included, but once again omitting "The Sweetest Girl". The album versions of "The Prince", "One Step Beyond...", "The Return of the Los Palmas 7", "Cardiac Arrest", "Shut Up" and "Tomorrow's Just Another Day" were replaced with the single versions, although the heavily edited version of "Shut Up" was used, which, at 2:51, fades out more than 30 seconds short of the actual single version.

Track listing
 "The Prince" from One Step Beyond...
 "One Step Beyond" from One Step Beyond...
 "My Girl" from One Step Beyond...
 "Night Boat to Cairo" from One Step Beyond...
 "Baggy Trousers" from Absolutely
 "Embarrassment" from Absolutely
 "The Return of the Los Palmas 7" from Absolutely
 "Grey Day" from 7
 "Shut Up" from 7
 "It Must Be Love" Single release only
 "Cardiac Arrest" from 7
 "House of Fun" Single release only
 "Driving in My Car" Single release only
 "Our House" from The Rise & Fall
 "Tomorrow's Just Another Day" from The Rise & Fall
 "Wings of a Dove" Single release only
 "The Sun and the Rain" Single release only
 "Michael Caine" from Keep Moving
 "One Better Day" from Keep Moving
 "Yesterday's Men" from Mad Not Mad
 "Uncle Sam" from Mad Not Mad
 "(Waiting for the) Ghost Train" from Utter Madness

Chart performance

Certifications and sales

References

External links

1992 greatest hits albums
Madness (band) compilation albums
Madness (band) video albums
Virgin Records compilation albums